Route nationale 41 (RN 41) is a secondary highway in Madagascar of 41 km, running from Fandriana to the intersection with RN 7. It crosses the region of Amoron'i Mania.

Selected locations on route
(north to south)
Fandriana - 41 km
near Ambositra - (intersection with RN 7)

See also
List of roads in Madagascar
Transport in Madagascar

References

Roads in Amoron'i Mania
Roads in Madagascar